General Services Administration-approved safes and vaults are certified high-security safes and vault doors for military and embassy applications. Each vault door under this specification meets stringent criteria and has passed the qualification tests and inspections performed at a Government test facility for the General Services Administration.

Requirements
The protection levels certified above applies only to the door and not to the vault proper.

Class 5-V 
A United States Government Class 5-V vault door, which has been tested and approved by the Government under Fed. Spec. AA-D-600D, affords the following security protection:
 20 man-hours against surreptitious entry.
 30 man-minutes against covert entry.
 10 man-minutes against forced entry.

Class 5-A
A United States Government Class 5-A vault door, which has been tested and approved by the Government under Fed. Spec. AA-D-600D, affords the following security protection:
 30 man-minutes against covert entry.
 10 man-minutes against forced entry.

Class 5-B 
A United States Government Class 5-B vault door, which has been tested and approved by the Government under Fed. Spec. AA-D-600D, is ballistic resistant and affords the following security protection:
 20 man-hours against surreptitious entry.
 30 man-minutes against covert entry.
 10 man-minutes against forced entry.

References

Security
Standards of the United States
General Services Administration